Metropolitan Building is the number 46.26 building on Chowringhee Road in Kolkata near Esplanade. Formerly known as the Whiteway Laidlaw department store, it was a famous department store in Calcutta during the British Rule in India. This neo-baroque emporium—with domes, a clock tower and arched recessed windows—exemplifies fashionable shopping during the British Raj in British India. 

The building was built in 1905. Post Independence Metropolitan Life Insurance Co. assumed ownership, so people know it more commonly as Metropolitan Building. Currently it is owned by the Life Insurance Corporation of India (LIC). It is located near the Shaheed Minar and the Grand Hotel.

History 
The building was built in 1905. 

After Independence, the Metropolitan Life Insurance Co. assumed ownership, so people know it more commonly as Metropolitan Building.

Renovation
The building was restored by the Life Insurance Corporation of India (LIC). But it still houses a commercial complex.  The building was freshly repainted with white and golden paint and its exterior structure was also renovated while making extensive changes within.

Features
It is a large building recognisable by its corner tower with the dome raised high on a pavilion. Rustication in the ground floor and a semicircular arched arcade in the first floor. The facade is punctuated by a series of projected and pedimented bays with plain columns and Corinthian capitals.

Gallery

See also
Esplanade, Kolkata
Jawaharlal Nehru Road
Chowringhee

References

External links

Buildings and structures in Kolkata